Naseema is a 1983 Indian Malayalam film, directed by A. Sheriff. The film stars Mohanlal, Nedumudi Venu, Nithya, and Ranipadmini in the lead roles. The film has a musical score by Johnson.

Cast
Mohanlal as Saithali
Nedumudi Venu as Ravi
Nithya as Usha
Ranipadmini as Naseema
Achankunju as Mammad
Bahadoor as Master
Bobby Kottarakkara
Philomina as Naseema's mother
Santhakumari as Ravi's mother

Soundtrack
The music was composed by Johnson and the lyrics were written by P. Bhaskaran.

References

External links
 

1983 films
1980s Malayalam-language films